The Sultanate of Palembang Darussalam (كسلطانن ڤلامبڠ دارالسلام) is a sultanate in Indonesia whose capital was the city of Palembang in the southern part of the Indonesian island of Sumatra. It was proclaimed in 1659 by Susuhunan Abdurrahman (1659–1706) and dissolved by the colonial government of the Dutch East Indies on October 7, 1823. In 1825, its last ruler, Sultan Ahmad Najamuddin, was arrested and sent into exile on the island of Banda Neira in the Moluccas.

History

Sultan Muhammad Bahauddin (reigned 1776–1803) had Kuto Besak's palace built. In 1821, the Dutch attack Palembang again and take the city. The sultanate is dissolved and the fort of Kuto Tengkuruk shaved. The Dutch have built in its place an administrative residence which is now the Sultan Mahmud Badaruddin II museum.

Establishment and early records

According to the story of Kidung Pamacangah and Babad Arya Tabanan it was said that a figure from Kediri named Arya Damar who was a "regent of Palembang" joined Gajah Mada, ruler of Majapahit in conquering Bali in 1343. Historian C.C. Berg thought that Arya Damar is identical with Adityawarman. The name Palembang was also mentioned in Nagarakretagama as one of the conquered land of Majapahit. Gajah Mada also mentioned the name Palembang in Pararaton as one of the regions that he conquered.

A Chinese chronicle Chu-fan-chi written in 1178 by Chou-Ju-Kua recorded the name Pa-lin-fong, an obvious corruption of the word Palembang. Around 1513, Tomé Pires an adventurer from Portugal mentioned Palembang, a kingdom which is led by a patron who was appointed from Java who was then referred to the Sultanate of Demak and participated in the invasion of Melaka which was then controlled by the Portuguese. In 1596, Palembang was attacked and razed by the Dutch East India Company. In 1659, the name Sri Susuhunan Abdurrahman was recorded as sovereign of the Palembang Sultanate. Records of connection with the VOC has been mentioned since year 1601.

Kraton Kuto Gawang ( -1659)
In the beginning of the 17th-century, Palembang became one of the centers of Islam in Indonesia. The precursor of the sultanate in Palembang was founded by Ki Gede ing Suro, a nobleman from Demak Sultanate, who took refuge in friendly Palembang during the troubles following the death of Trenggana of Demak. On the north bank of the Musi River, he and the nobilities established a kraton, the Kuto Gawang. It was located quite strategically on the riverfront of the Musi, in the present 2-Ilir District, within what is now the complex of PT. Pupuk Sriwidjaja, a state-run fertilizer manufacturer. It is described to be about 290 Rijnlandsche roede (1093 meters) in length and width. The kraton stretches between what is now Plaju and Pulau Kemaro, a small island located in the middle of the Musi River.

The Kraton of Kuto Gawang was sketched by Joan van der Laen in 1659. The sketch shows a fortified city facing the Musi River with the Rengas River running through the middle part of the city from north to south. The Taligawe River is located to the east of Kuto Gawang, while to the west is Buah River. In the middle of Kuto Gawang is a structure, possibly a mosque, located to the west of Rengas River. The Kraton was described to also had three stone bastions. Foreigners (e.g. the Chinese and Portuguese) were known to settle on the banks of the Musi River opposite of the Kraton, to the west of the mouth of Komering River.

In 1659, the Dutch of the Dutch East India Company attacked and razed Kraton Kuto Gawang. The Susuhunan (king) Abdurrahman later moved his court to a new site called Beringin Janggut.

Kraton Beringin Janggut (1659- ) 

After the Kuto Gawang was destroyed by the Dutch East India Company forces in 1659, Susuhunan Abdurrahman ordered  the court to move to new Kraton, the Beringin Janggut, which was located in the vicinity of the Old Mosque (now Jalan Segaran). There is no written record of how is the shape, the size, or the existence of Beringin Janggut.

The area of the Kraton Beringin Janggut was known to be surrounded with a network of canals: the Musi River to the south, Tengkuruk River to the west, Penedan canal to the north, and Rendang or Karang Waru River to the east. The Penedan canal was connected with Kemenduran, Kapuran and Kebon Duku canals. The network of canals was the main mode of transportation for people during this period of the Sultanate.

Kraton Kuto Tengkuruk ( -1797) 

During the reign of Sultan Mahmud Badaruddin I, the fifty-hectares wide Kraton Kuto Tengkuruk or Kuto Lamo became the main center of the Palembang Sultanate. Kraton Kuto Tengkuruk was bordered with Kapuran River (now Pasar Cinde) to the north, Tengkuruk River to the east (in what is now the complex of Pupuk Sriwidjaja Palembang), River Musi to the south, and Sekanak River (now Lambidaro River in 36 Ilir) to the west. The landmarks of Kraton Kuto Tengkuruk were the domed Great Mosque and the palace proper of Kuto Batu / Kuto Tengkuruk.

Kraton Kuto Besak (1797-1823) 

During the reign of Sultan Muhamad Bahaudin (1776–1803), the Kraton Kuto Besak was built, and was completed in 1797. It is the largest kraton the Palembang Sultanate ever built and the only one to still stand today, albeit in altered form. Kuto Besak was located to the west of the site of old Kuto Tengkuruk. The site of Kuto Besak has a length of 288.75 meters, width of 183.75 meters, wall heightof  9.99 meters, and wall thickness of 1.99 meters which ran long east–west direction (upstream-downstream Musi). In every corner of the fortification wall are bastions, and the portal to the fortified city is located on the eastern, southern, and western sides. The southern portal is the main gate, known as Lawang Kuto. The secondary portals are known as Lawang Buratan, however only one portal still exists to the west of the Kuto Besak.

Following the Palembang War of 1821 and the dissolution of the Sultanate on 7 October 1823, the Kuto Tengkuruk was razed to the ground. 

On top of the destroyed Kuto Tengkuruk, under the order of van Sevenhoven, a new building was constructed and was established as the residence of the Regeering Commissaris. The building is now Sultan Mahmud Badaruddin II Museum.

The sultanate today
Currently, there are two separate claimants to the sultanate, each running their own courts.

In 2003, the Palembang Sultanate Custom Community Council recognized Raden Haji Muhammad Syafei Prabu Diradja, a retired police officer, as a descendant of Sultan Mahmud Badaruddin II and proceeded to elect him as Sultan Mahmud Badaruddin III. The coronation took place in Lawang Kidul Mosque, near the tomb of Sultan Mahmud Badaruddin I (reigned 1724–1756). The elderly Mahmud Badaruddin III later died on 8 September 2017, and was succeeded by his youngest son and heir apparent Raden Muhammad Fauwaz Diradja, who reigned as Mahmud Badaruddin IV.

In 2006, Haji Raden Mahmud Badaruddin, chairman of Palembang Sultanate Lineage Association, was crowned Sultan Iskandar Mahmud Badaruddin following an adat deliberation. He is a direct male-line descendant of Prince Purboyo, son of Sultan Muhammad Mansyur, and the daughter of Mahmud Badaruddin I. His election as a rival sultan was controversial, though unlikely to cause any legal issue. The Palembang Sultanate was formally abolished in 1823, so the sultans have no authority beyond cultural and customary duties.

Lists of Sultans of Palembang

Sultanate of Palembang Darussalam (1659 - 1823) 
Sri Susuhunan Abdurrahman (1659–1706), founder of the Sultanate, brother of Prince Sedo ing Rajek, the previous ruler of Palembang
 Sultan Muhammad Mansyur Jayo Ing Lago (1706–1718), son of Abdurrahman
 Sultan Agung Komaruddin Sri Teruno (1718–1724), son of Abdurrahman
 Sultan Mahmud Badaruddin I Jayo Wikramo (1724–1757), son of Muhammad Mansyur
Sultan Anom Alimuddin (1724-1727), jointly ruled with his half-brother Mahmud Badaruddin I until was driven out
 Sultan Ahmad Najamuddin I Adi Kusumo (1757–1776), son of Mahmud Badaruddin I
 Sultan Muhammad Bahauddin (1776–1803), son of Ahmad Najamuddin I
 Sultan Mahmud Badaruddin II (1803–1812, 1813, 1817–1821), son of Muhammad Bahauddin
 Sultan Ahmad Najamuddin II (1812–1813, 1813–1817, 1821–1823), son of Muhammad Bahauddin
Sultan Ahmad Najamuddin III (1819-1821), son of Mahmud Badaruddin II
 Sultan Ahmad Najamuddin IV Prabu Anom (1821–1823), son of Ahmad Najamuddin II

Descendants of Mahmud Badaruddin II (2003 - present day) 
 Sultan Mahmud Badaruddin III Prabu Diradja Al-Hajj (2003–2017)
 Sultan Mahmud Badaruddin IV Djaya Wikrama (2017-now)

Family Tree

Gallery

See also
 Palembangese people

References

Cited works

External links 
 Official website of Palembang Sultanate

Sultanates